The graceful splayfoot salamander (Chiropterotriton cracens), also known as the graceful flat-footed salamander, is a species of salamander in the family Plethodontidae. It is endemic to the Tamaulipas state in northeastern Mexico. Its type locality is near Gómez Farías, Tamaulipas.

Description
Chiropterotriton cracens is a small, slender salamander. Adults measure  in snout–vent length. The tail is long, maximally 1.5 times the snout-vent length. Limbs are well developed; hind legs are slightly longer than forelegs. Dorsal colour is light brown, sides are slightly darker.

Females collected in summer had more and smaller eggs than those collected in spring when eggs were quite large, but few in number (3-5 per side). Juveniles ( body length) have been collected in May and August.

Habitat and conservation
Its natural habitat are cloud forests between 1000 and 2000 meters elevation, where it lives in bromeliads.

Chiropterotriton cracens only known from the El Cielo Biosphere Reserve, a protected area. Despite this, Chiropterotriton cracens has declined. The reasons for this decline are unknown but could relate to climate change or disease (e.g. chytridiomycosis).

References

Chiropterotriton
Endemic amphibians of Mexico
Fauna of the Sierra Madre Oriental
Taxonomy articles created by Polbot
Amphibians described in 1958